Mark West Springs is set of springs in eastern Santa Rosa, California that were used as a resort since 1880 and perhaps earlier.
Mark West Springs is located on Porter Creek Road in the Mayacamas Mountains.  Mark West Creek flows through the community.
 
Mark West Springs is named for Scottish American pioneer William Marcus West.

See also
Mark West, California

References

Reference bibliography

External links
 Mark West Springs Online - Online Community
 Mark West Springs Chamber of Commerce

Unincorporated communities in Sonoma County, California
Mayacamas Mountains
Unincorporated communities in California